Interstate 490 (I-490), also known as O'Hare West Bypass and Western O'Hare Beltway, is a proposed electronic toll highway and a beltway near Chicago, Illinois, that would run along the west side of O'Hare International Airport. The tollway would connect I-294 (Tri-State Tollway) to a western access point to the airport. From there, it would continue northward to an extension of the Illinois Route 390 (IL 390, formerly known as the Elgin-O'Hare Expressway) and I-90 (Jane Addams Memorial Tollway). The O'Hare Western Bypass is part of the Elgin–O'Hare Western Access (EOWA) project. Building the highway would affect the villages of Elk Grove Village, Wood Dale, Itasca, and Bensenville. The proposed route runs through the American Airlines Flight 191 crash site, the deadliest aviation accident in US history.

Route description 
I-490 will begin at a partial interchange with I-294 (Tri-State Tollway) in Franklin Park, south of O'Hare International Airport. There will be an interchange with Franklin Avenue/Green Street. The tollway will head north before curving westward to briefly parallel the Canadian Pacific Railway before crossing it. Immediately afterward, the tollway will have an interchange with IL 19 (Irving Park Road). On the western side of O'Hare International Airport, I-490 will have an interchange with IL 390 (Elgin–O'Hare Tollway) at the entrance to a planned western terminal. Continuing north, I-490 will cross over the Canadian Pacific Railway and the Union Pacific Railroad Milwaukee Subdivision and have an interchange with IL 72 (Touhy Avenue) before ending at a trumpet interchange with I-90 (Jane Addams Memorial Tollway) in Des Plaines.

History 
In December 2009, the Illinois Department of Transportation (IDOT) finalized the routing of the western bypass. Intermediate interchanges are planned at County Line Road/Franklin Avenue, IL 19, IL 390, and IL 72.

On August 25, 2011, the Illinois State Toll Highway Authority (ISHTA) approved a $12-billion (equivalent to $ in ) capital plan called Move Illinois, which seeks to improve toll roads under their jurisdiction; the authority doubled toll rates to help fund it. The bypass is also part of the EOWA project.

On October 6, 2014, IDOT submitted an application to the American Association of State Highway and Transportation Officials (AASHTO) for the creation of the new I-490 designation. AASHTO approved the I-490 designation on November 20, 2014, contingent on Federal Highway Administration (FHWA) approval.

In November 2015, the Canadian Pacific Railway (doing business in the US as the Soo Line Railroad) sought a federal injunction to block ISHTA from acquiring land in the Bensenville Rail Yard to build the tollway, over fears that this would impact rail traffic. In 2016, ISHTA sued the Canadian Pacific Railway (which does business in the US as the Soo Line Railroad) to request that the United States Surface Transportation Board allow for the construction of the tollway. On June 13, 2018, ISHTA and the Canadian Pacific Railway agreed to settle the dispute.

Construction on the interchange with I-90 began on September 12, 2018; the interchange is scheduled to be finished in 2023. The project is planned to be finished in 2026.

In preparation for the interchange at Interstate 90, and the widening of I-90, the Des Plaines over-highway oasis structure was permanently closed on March 16, 2014. The over-highway oasis structure began to be deconstructed immediately, but the gas stations and gas station stores remained open. These businesses were eventually closed on December 14, 2018. The oasis, which opened on June 24, 1959, was the second oldest of the five original tollway oases in Illinois. The gas station buildings were finally demolished in April 2019, and the new bridge decks over I-90, placed almost exactly where the oasis was previously located, were installed in June 2019.

Exit list

See also

References

External links

Expressways in the Chicago area
4 (Illinois)
Toll roads in Illinois
90-4 (Illinois)
90-4
Transportation in Cook County, Illinois
Transportation in DuPage County, Illinois
Franklin Park, Illinois
Bensenville, Illinois
Elk Grove Village, Illinois
Des Plaines, Illinois